This is a list of national parks within Australia that are managed by Australian, state and territory governments. The name may be a misnomer: nearly all parks are land owned and managed by the states and territories rather than the national government.

Australian Capital Territory 

Parks in this area are managed by the Transport Canberra & City Services.

New South Wales 

Parks in this area are managed by the NSW National Parks & Wildlife Service

Northern Territory

Queensland 

Parks in this area are managed by the Queensland Parks & Wildlife Service

South Australia 

Parks in this area are managed by the National Parks & Wildlife Service South Australia.

Tasmania 

Parks in this area are managed by the Tasmania Parks & Wildlife Service

Victoria 

Parks in this area are managed by Parks Victoria

Western Australia 

Parks in this area are managed by the Department of Biodiversity, Conservation & Attractions

External territories 
Parks in the external territories are managed by the Director of National Parks

See also
Protected areas of Australia

References

National parks
 
Australia
National parks